I, His Father (Italian: Io, suo padre) is a 1939 Italian sports drama film directed by Mario Bonnard and starring Erminio Spalla, Mariella Lotti and Clara Calamai.

It was shot at the Scalera Studios in Rome. The film's sets were designed by the art director Ottavio Scotti.

Cast
 Erminio Spalla as Romolo Tonelli 
 Augusto Lanza as Augusto Tonelli 
 Evi Maltagliati as Eva 
 Mariella Lotti as Anna 
 Clara Calamai as Renata 
 Margherita Bagni as Amalia Tonelli 
 Carlo Romano as Giorgio 
 Piero Pastore as Sandro 
 Guido Notari as Roberto 
 Vittorio Venturi as Radesio 
 Virgilio Riento as Il cavaliere 
 Lauro Gazzolo as Sardella 
 Alfredo Varelli as Un amico di Radesio 
 Gemma Bolognesi as La signora Giulia

References

Bibliography

External links

1939 films
1930s Italian-language films
Films directed by Mario Bonnard
Italian sports drama films
1930s sports drama films
Italian boxing films
Films based on Italian novels
Films shot at Scalera Studios
Italian black-and-white films
1930s Italian films